"The Robots" is a single by German electronic-music group Kraftwerk, which was released in 1978. The single and its B-side, "Spacelab", both appeared on the band's seventh album, The Man-Machine (1978). However, the songs as they appear on the single were edited into shorter versions.

Composition 
Lyrically, the song discusses the role of robots as subservient workers to humans. The Russian lines "" ("I am your servant / I am your worker") (also on the rear sleeve of the album) during the intro and again during its repetition at the bridge are spoken in a pitched down voice, the main lyrics ("We're charging our batteries and now we're full of energy...") are "sung" through a vocoder; the line references the Slavic origins of the word 'robot'. 

The song's refrain became a major identifying symbol for the band, and has been frequently referenced: Wolfgang Flür, a member of Kraftwerk at the time of the single's release, later wrote the book  (Kraftwerk: I Was a Robot in English). The lyrics were also referenced in the title of a BBC Radio 4 documentary Kraftwerk: We Are the Robots, broadcast for the first time on Thursday, 22 November 2007.

Live performances 
The band's performance of the song has varied significantly over time: For example, one report of a performance in 1997 describes "four legless robot bodies [being] lowered from a lighting rig and programmed to make mechanical movements to the music",  another from the following year describes the spectacle as "robot torsos and heads [being] suspended in the air, slowly twisting and waving as the music plays on",  and yet another describes witnessing on-screen "plastic-head representations of the band, stuck on dull gray torsos with mechanical arms and metal-rod legs". The lyrics "We are the robots" flash up on this screen, followed by the line "We are programmed / just to do / anything you want us to." The screen then lifts to reveal the band following their transformation into robots. But they are said not to move "in the popping spurts that robots are famous for; they swiveled and moved their arms slowly, thoughtfully, humanly, as if practicing t'ai chi". It has also been said that these "robots" give a far more lifelike performance than the band themselves. There was, however, "an air of farce" at one show in Ireland in 2008 when a curtain refused to close, disrupting the transformation of the band into robots. Stagehands had to intervene and close the curtain themselves, after which the sequence could continue.

Reception
"The Robots" is widely regarded as one of Kraftwerk's best songs. In 2020, Billboard and The Guardian ranked the song number two and number six, respectively, on their lists of the greatest Kraftwerk songs.

Track listing 

 1978 7-inch single

Charts

1991 re-issue 

In 1991, a re-recorded and re-arranged version of "The Robots" was issued as a single from the band's tenth album, The Mix (1991). It charted in several European countries, reaching number 52 on the Eurochart Hot 100. A new music video was also produced to promote the single. Pan-European magazine Music & Media wrote, "The pioneers of synthesizer pop live up to their reputation. Hi-tech for EHR."

Track listing 
 1991 7-inch single

 1991 12-inch single

 1991 CD single

 Cassette single

Charts

References 

1978 singles
1991 singles
1978 songs
Electronic songs
EMI Records singles
English-language German songs
Kraftwerk songs
Songs about robots
Songs written by Karl Bartos
Songs written by Florian Schneider
Songs written by Ralf Hütter